The Moscow Bridge is a pedestrian bridge that spans the river Morača in Podgorica, the capital city of Montenegro.

Description
The metal construction of the bridge was a gift by the city of Moscow to the people of Montenegro. It measures 105 meters long, and its construction cost around 2.2 million Euros. It was officially opened on 19 December 2008, by the Montenegrin president Filip Vujanović, the Mayor of Podgorica Miomir Mugoša, and Aleksey Aleksandrov, head of the Central Administrative Okrug of Moscow.

Construction
Moskovski bridge connects the Hercegovačka street with the monument to Vladimir Vysotsky, a famous Soviet singer, songwriter, poet, and actor. The main project was designed by the Russian Giprostroymost Institute, with help of the Faculty of Civil Engineering of Podgorica. It was built by Energomash from Belgorod, Russia, Intermost from Belgrade, Serbia and Bomanite from Budva, Montenegro.

See also

 Montenegro–Russia relations
 Millennium Bridge
 Blažo Jovanović Bridge

References

Tourist attractions in Podgorica
Bridges in Podgorica
Bridges completed in 2008